Gringo Honeymoon is an album by Texas-based country and folk singer-songwriter Robert Earl Keen released in the United States in August 1994 on Sugar Hill Records.

The title track tells of the singer and his wife crossing the Rio Grande in Big Bend National Park, Texas, to have an eventful visit in the small Mexican town of Boquillas del Carmen located in the state of Coahuila.

Track listing
All tracks written by Robert Earl Keen, except where noted:

"Think It Over One Time" – 3:50
"Tom Ames' Prayer" (Steve Earle) – 3:23
"Gringo Honeymoon" – 5:19
"The Raven And The Coyote" – 5:12
"Lonely Feeling" – 8:30
"Merry Christmas from the Family" – 4:45
"Barbeque" – 4:41
"Lynnville Train" (Robert Earl Keen, LeRoy Preston) – 5:03
"I'm Comin' Home" – 3:47
"Dreadful Selfish Crime" – 8:17

Production
Produced By Garry Velletri
Engineers: Jeff Coppage
Assistant Engineers: Brad Jones
Mixing: Roger Moutenot
Mastering: Randy LeRoy

Personnel
Jeff Coppage, Dennis Locorriere, Rebecca Stout, Gillian Welch - backing vocals
Rich Brotherton, George Marinelli, Gurf Morlix - guitars
Tommy Spurlock - steel & pedal steel
Brad Jones - organ, piano, percussion
Garry Tallent - bass
David Heath - upright bass, backing vocals
Bryan Duckworth - fiddle, backing vocals
Jonathan Yudkin - violin
Dave Durocher, Mark Patterson - drums
Sam Bacco - percussion

References

1994 albums
Robert Earl Keen albums
Sugar Hill Records albums